Salmo is a genus of ray-finned fish from the family Salmonidae. The single Salmo species naturally found in the Atlantic North America is the Atlantic salmon, whereas the salmon and trout of the Pacific basin belong to another genus, Oncorhynchus. The natural distribution of Salmo also extends to North Africa and to West Asia around the Black Sea basin.

The generic name Salmo derives from the Latin salmō (salmon). The number of distinct species and subspecies in Salmo is a debated issue. Atlantic salmon and brown trout are widespread species, while most of the other taxa are narrowly distributed forms endemic to single watersheds.

Species
The species currently listed in this genus are:
 Salmo abanticus Tortonese, 1954 (Lake Abant trout)
 Salmo aestivalis Fortunatov, 1926 (Lake Sevan summer trout)
 Salmo akairos Delling & Doadrio, 2005 (Lake Ifni trout)
 Salmo aphelios Kottelat, 1997 (summer trout)
 Salmo balcanicus (S. L. Karaman, 1927) (Struga trout)
Salmo baliki Davut Turan, İsmail Aksu, Münevver Oral, Cüneyt Kaya, Esra Bayçelebi - 2021
 Salmo carpio Linnaeus, 1758 (Lake Garda trout)
 Salmo caspius Kessler, 1877 (Caspian trout) 
 Salmo cettii Rafinesque, 1810 (Mediterranean trout)
 Salmo ciscaucasicus Dorofeeva, 1967 (Terek trout)
 Salmo coruhensis Turan, Kottelat & Engin, 2010 (Çoruh river trout) 
 Salmo danilewskii (Gul'elmi, 1888) (Gokcha lake trout)
 Salmo dentex (Heckel, 1851) (Zubatak trout) 
 Salmo euphrataeus Turan, Kottelat & Engin, 2014 (Euphrates trout) 
 Salmo ezenami L. S. Berg, 1948 (Kezenoi-am trout)
 Salmo farioides S. L. Karaman, 1938 (Balkan brook trout)
 Salmo ferox Jardine, 1835 (Ferox trout)
 Salmo fibreni Zerunian & Gandolfi, 1990 (Fibreno trout) 
 Salmo gegarkuni Kessler, 1877 (Gokcha trout)
 Salmo ischchan Kessler, 1877 (Sevan trout)
 Salmo kottelati Turan, Doğan, Kaya, & Kanyılmaz, 2014 (Alakir trout) 
 Salmo labecula Turan, Kottelat & Engin, 2012 
 Salmo labrax Pallas, 1814 (Black Sea trout)
 Salmo letnica (S. L. Karaman, 1924) (Pestani trout)
 Salmo lourosensis Delling, 2011 (Louros trout)
 Salmo lumi G. D. Poljakov, Filipi, Basho & Hysenaj, 1958 (Lumi trout)
 Salmo macedonicus (S. L. Karaman, 1924) (Macedonian trout)
 Salmo macrostigma (A. H. A. Duméril, 1858) (Maghreb trout)
 Salmo marmoratus G. Cuvier, 1829 (marble trout)
 Salmo montenigrinus (S. L. Karaman, 1933) (Montenegro trout)
 Salmo multipunctata Doadrio, Perea & Yahyaoui, 2015 (Draa trout) 
 Salmo nigripinnis Günther, 1866 (Sonaghen trout)
 Salmo obtusirostris (Heckel, 1851) 
 S. o. krkensis (S. L. Karaman, 1927) (Krka softmouth trout)
 S. o. obtusirostris Heckel, 1851 (softmouth trout)
 S. o. oxyrhynchus (Steindachner, 1882) (Neretva softmouth trout)
 S. o. salonitana (S. L. Karaman, 1927) (Jadro softmouth trout)
 S. o. zetenzis (Hadžišče, 1961) (Zeta softmouth trout)
 Salmo ohridanus Steindachner, 1892 (Ohrid trout)
 Salmo okumusi Turan, Kottelat & Engin, 2014 (Western Euphrates trout) 
 Salmo opimus Turan, Kottelat & Engin, 2012 
 †Salmo pallaryi Pellegrin, 1924 (Sidi Ali trout)
 Salmo pelagonicus S. L. Karaman, 1938 (Pelagonian trout)
 Salmo pellegrini F. Werner, 1931 (Tensift trout) 
 Salmo peristericus S. L. Karaman, 1938 (Prespa trout)
 Salmo platycephalus Behnke, 1968 (flathead trout)
 Salmo rhodanensis Fowler, 1974 (Rhône trout)
 Salmo rizeensis Turan, Kottelat & Engin, 2010 (Rize River trout) 
 Salmo salar Linnaeus, 1758 (Atlantic salmon) 
 Salmo schiefermuelleri Bloch, 1784 (Austrian Lakes trout) 
 Salmo stomachicus Günther, 1866 (Gillaroo trout) 
 Salmo taleri (S. L. Karaman, 1933) (Zeta trout)
 Salmo tigridis Turan, Kottelat & Bektaş, 2011 (Upper Tigris trout)
 Salmo trutta Linnaeus, 1758 
 S. t. aralensis L. S. Berg, 1908 (Aral trout)
 S. t. fario Linnaeus, 1758 (brown trout)
 S. t. lacustris Linnaeus, 1758 (lake trout)
 S. t. oxianus Kessler, 1874 (Amu-Darya trout)
 S. t. trutta Linnaeus, 1758 (sea trout)
 Salmo viridis Doadrio, Perea & Yahyaoui, 2015 (green trout)

References

 
Extant Miocene first appearances
Ray-finned fish genera
Taxa named by Carl Linnaeus